Ole Berg (7 October 1890 – 23 September 1968) was a Norwegian military officer. He participated in the defence during the German invasion of Norway in 1940.  

He built up the Norwegian police forces in Sweden from 1943 to 1945. He served as Chief of Defence of Norway from 1946 to 1955. In 1947 he was awarded the title of Commander with Star of the Royal Norwegian Order of St. Olav.

References

1890 births
1968 deaths
Norwegian military leaders of World War II
Norwegian Army generals
Chiefs of Defence (Norway)